The Philippines' Fertilizer and Pesticide Authority (abbreviated as FPA), is a technical regulatory agency under the Department of Agriculture. The agency is responsible for assuring adequate supply of fertilizer and pesticide at reasonable prices; rationalizing the manufacture and marketing of fertilizer; protecting the public from the risks of the inherent use of pesticides; and educating the agricultural sector in the use of these inputs.

History
In 1972–1973, Philippines was beset by rice production shortfalls resulting from the series of typhoons and floods and fertilizer shortages spawned by the oil crisis. The resulting fourfold drop in rice production prompted the government to directly intervene in the operations of the fertilizer industry through the issuance of Presidential Decree (P.D.) No. 135 dated February 22, 1973, creating the Fertilizer Industry Authority (FIA).

Fertilizer and pesticide are vital agricultural inputs in food production and must be supplied in adequate quantities at reasonable costs at all times. The fertilizer and pesticide industries have much in common in terms of clientele, distribution channels, system of application in farmers' fields and technical supervision by the same farm management technicians under the government's food production program. In view hereof, the government abolished the FIA and created the Fertilizer and Pesticide Authority on May 30, 1977, by virtue of P.D. 1144.

The FPA is mandated to assure adequate supplies of fertilizer and pesticide at reasonable prices; rationalize the manufacture and marketing of fertilizer; protect the public from the risks inherent in the use of pesticides; and educate the agricultural sector in the use of these inputs. It was attached to the Department of Agriculture until President Benigno C. Aquino, on May 5, 2014, issued Executive Order No. 165 transferring the FPA and the three other agencies, the NIA, the PCA and the NFA, to the Office of the President of the Philippines.

In September 2018, President Rodrigo Duterte issued Executive Order No. 62 that transferred the agency from the Office of the President to the Department of Agriculture.

Vision
Sustained agricultural productivity in a wholesome environment through integrated plant nutrients management and safe crop protection systems.

Mission
To be a catalyst in the empowerment of farmers and fisherfolk by helping them become better informed, and more efficient and conscientious in the management of their plant nutrition and crop protection requirements and preservation of marine and aquatic resources to increase their agricultural productivity, increase income and assist the Philippine government in its sustainable development plan including its goal on rice sufficiency.

References

External links
FPA Homepage

Department of Agriculture (Philippines)
Pesticide organizations
Establishments by Philippine presidential decree